Hovhannes "Jean" Semerdjian (9 March 1920 – 27 August 2013), also known as Jean Jansem, was a French-Armenian painter. Jansem's artworks are internationally known, and are part of museum collections throughout France, Japan and the United States. A Foreign member of the National Academy of Sciences of Armenia (2002).

He was awarded by the Ordre des Arts et des Lettres in 1953 and by the Knight of the French Legion of Honour in 2003. The President of Armenia awarded Jansem a Medal of Honor for his “reinforcement of Armenian-French cultural ties.”

Biography

Hovhannes Semerdjian was born in 1920 in Bursa, then in the Ottoman Empire. In 1922, his family fled to Greece. He spent his childhood in Thessaloniki. They arrived to Issy-les-Moulineaux suburb of Paris, France in 1931 when he was 11 and that is when he begin to paint. The first professional schools for Jansem became free academies of Montparnasse (1934–1936). He studied in the Ecole des Arts Decoratifs.
His teachers were Brianshon, Legjon and Udon. Jansem also studied at the Sabatie studio for a year. Early paintings by Jansem were mainly to national issues. He had individual exhibitions in Paris, New York, Chicago, London, Tokyo, Rome, Brussels, Lausanne, Beirut etc. Hovhannes Semerdjian was elected the President of the Young Artists' Saloon in 1956.

He won the Comparison prize in Mexico in 1958. In Japan, two museums were built to honor Jansem′s work, located in Tokyo Ginza and Nagano Prefecture Azumino. In 1973 he visited Armenia for the first time. In 2001, 34 of his paintings were given to the Armenian Genocide Museum. 
Jansem’s primary sources of inspiration were Goya and Brueghel. His mother and his children were the main heroes in his earlier works. Jansem was characterized as a miserablist, an artist of unfortunate people.

On 10 March 2010, the day after Jansem's 90th birthday, during a visit to France, the President of Armenia awarded Jansem a medal of honour saying the following, "Our nation is proud of you and values highly your art. While living outside Armenia, you have made our country more recognizable, extending our nation's good name all over the world."

Jansem died on 27 August 2013, aged 93, outside Paris.

Awards
Ordre des Arts et des Lettres (1953),
Prix Comparaison (1958, Mexico),
prize of the Biennale (1962, Bruges), 
Panamanian prize «Vahagn» (2002), 
Mesrop Mashtots Medal (2002), 
Legion d'honneur (2003),
Medal of Honor (2010, Armenia).

References

External links

Jean Jansem's biography
Jean Jansem website
President Sarkisian Honors French-Armenian Artist Jansem
Jean Jansem paintings
Azumino Jansem museum

1920 births
2013 deaths
People from Bursa
Ethnic Armenian painters
French people of Armenian descent
20th-century French painters
20th-century French male artists
French male painters
21st-century French painters
21st-century French male artists
École nationale supérieure des arts décoratifs alumni
French contemporary artists
Emigrants from the Ottoman Empire to Greece
Greek emigrants to France